Ciortești is a commune in Iași County, Western Moldavia, Romania. It is composed of five villages: Ciortești, Coropceni, Deleni, Rotăria and Șerbești.

References

Communes in Iași County
Localities in Western Moldavia